Sabina Panzanini (born February 16, 1972) is an Italian former Alpine skier. She competed at the 1994 Winter Olympics and the 1998 Winter Olympics.

Born in Eppan an der Weinstraße, in the South Tyrol, she competed in Alpine Skiing World Cup from 1991 to 2000, obtaining her first podium in December 1992 at Steamboat Springs. She won a total of 3 Giant Slalom victories.

World Cup victories

References

External links

1972 births
Living people
People from Eppan an der Weinstraße
Italian female alpine skiers
Olympic alpine skiers of Italy
Alpine skiers at the 1994 Winter Olympics
Alpine skiers at the 1998 Winter Olympics
Sportspeople from Südtirol